The 1931 Olympic Club Winged O football team represented the Olympic Club in the 1931 football season. The Olympic Club, originally the San Francisco Olympic Club, is the oldest athletic club in the United States.  They compiled a 6–3–2 record, and outscored their opponents by a total of 90 to 59.  The Club made front page news when they held the Stanford Indians to a scoreless tie and nearly defeated the Cal Golden Bears.  After upsetting an undefeated Saint Mary's team, half of the Winged O's boarded the SS Matsonia on November 18 for the Hawaiian Islands, where they would play the winner of the Honolulu All-Star game, and the other half stayed behind to fill a prearranged game with Loyola.

Schedule

References

Athletic Club football teams and seasons
Olympic Club football team